Binem Heller (1908–1998) was a Polish poet and activist.

Life
Heller was born in 1908 in Warsaw, and became a glove worker at the age of fourteen.

He emerged early as a leader of Poland's proletarian poets, equivalent to the Proletypen, with his first collection, "Through the Bars", published in Łódź in 1930.

From 1937 to 1939, he lived in Belgium and Paris. He returned to Warsaw, then fled to Bialystok before the Nazi armies. After the invasion of the Soviet Union, he took shelter in Alma-Ata, and in 1947, he returned to Poland, hoping to participate in a revival of its Jewish cultural life. "Spring in Poland" appeared in 1950, and "Poems, 1932-1939", in 1956.

He then moved to Paris and Brussels, where his poem of political renunciation, "Alas, how they shattered my life", caused a storm of controversy. A year later, he made Israel his home. His many later works include New poems (1964) and They shall arise (1984).

Binem Heller died in Israel in 1998.

References

Further reading
 

1998 deaths
Writers from Warsaw
1908 births
20th-century Polish poets
Burials at Yarkon Cemetery
Itzik Manger Prize recipients